The 1956 Melton by-election was held on 19 December 1956 after the resignation of the incumbent Conservative MP Anthony Nutting over a disagreement with his party over the Suez Crisis.  The by-election was won by the Conservative candidate Mervyn Pike.

References

Melton, 1956
Melton by-election
Melton by-election
Melton by-election
20th century in Leicestershire